Deh-e Shaduiyeh (also Romanized as Deh-e Shādū’īyeh) is a village in Jowzam Rural District, Dehaj District, Shahr-e Babak County, Kerman Province, Iran. At the 2006 census, its population was 397, in 112 families.

References 

Populated places in Shahr-e Babak County